Boris Komuczki (born 28 December 1956 in Rijeka) is a former Croatian handball player and coach.

Playing career
Komucki started playing handball at a young age in primary school in Trsat. He soon moved to RK Kvarner where he started his handball career.

He was supposed to play for the Yugoslav national team at the 1978 World Championship but couldn't due to mandatory military service.

In 1979 after being stripped the captain's arm band he moved to city rivals RK Zamet. With Zamet Komucki demolished his former club, won the city rivalry  to the extent that Kvarner admitted defeat in writing.

In 1981 Komucki spent a season in Belgrade playing for RK Crvena Zvezda and a season in Banja Luka with Borac.

Komucki had one more spell at RK Zamet where they almost entered the Yugoslav First League being one point short from Jugović Kać.

In 1985 he went to Italy to play for HC Firenze and Pallamano Conversano. In 1988 he moved to Germany and to play for Bayer 04 Leverkusen with whom he reached the semi-final of the DHB-Pokal. Komucki also played for TuS Nettelstedt-Lübbecke and TSV Grün-Weiß Dankersen.

Honours
As player
Kvarner
Yugoslav Second League (1): 1974–75
Croatian U-19 Championship (1): 1975
Croatian U-23 Championship (1): 1979

Zamet
Yugoslav Second League Runner-up (1): 1983–84

Individual
Best handball player in Rijeka - 1984

Sources
Petar Orgulić - 50 godina rukometa u Rijeci (2005), Adria public

References

Croatian male handball players
RK Zamet players
RK Kvarner players
RK Zamet coaches
Yugoslav male handball players
Handball players from Rijeka
1956 births
Living people
Croatian expatriate sportspeople in Italy
Croatian expatriate sportspeople in Spain
Croatian expatriate sportspeople in Germany